Gary W. Ladd (born April 28, 1950) is the Cowden Distinguished Professor in the T. Denny Sanford School of Social and Family Dynamics and the Department of Psychology at Arizona State University. He is also the editor-in-chief of Merrill-Palmer Quarterly.
He is known for his research on the prevalence and adverse effects of bullying on schoolchildren.

References

External links
 Faculty page

Living people
1950 births
21st-century American psychologists
Grove City College alumni
Alfred University alumni
University of Rochester alumni
Arizona State University faculty
Academic journal editors
Center for Advanced Study in the Behavioral Sciences fellows
20th-century American psychologists